Ashley Williams may refer to:

People
 Ashley Williams (footballer) (born 1984), Welsh international footballer
 Ashley Williams (Liberian footballer) (born 2000), Liberian footballer
 Ashley Williams (boxer) (born 1991), Welsh boxer
 Ashley Williams (actress) (born 1978), American actress
 Ashley Williams (designer) (born 1988/89), British fashion designer
 Ashley C. Williams (born 1984), American actress, singer, dancer and producer

Characters
 Ashley Williams (Mass Effect), a character in the Mass Effect video game series
 Ash Williams (Ashley Joanna Williams), a character in the Evil Dead film series